Bubsy 2 is a platform video game, the sequel to Bubsy in Claws Encounters of the Furred Kind, and the second game in the Bubsy series. It was originally released by Accolade in 1994 for the Sega Genesis, Super NES, and Game Boy, and re-released for Windows through Steam on December 17, 2015.

Story
A new theme park is announced. Bubsy, Arnold, and Bubsy's younger twin relatives are excited. Fearing that the place might get too crowded, the twins decide to break into the theme park on the eve of its opening day. The theme park, operated by a corrupt entrepreneur, Oinker P. Hamm, features virtual worlds of certain themes.

Gameplay
The game plays very similar to the prior game in the series, as a 2D sidescrolling platformer. Unlike the first game where playing through the stages is linear, in Bubsy II the player gets to choose stages. The player must still maneuver Bubsy through the level through jumping and gliding, and Bubsy still collects objects, only now they're marbles instead of yarn balls. The game features more variety than its predecessor. One new feature in the game was the ability to shoot a Nerf Ballzooka gun. A multiplayer mode was added as well, where a second player could control one of Bubsy's younger relatives. Bubsy can now take three hits before losing a life.

Development
Planning for the game started as early as a few months prior to the release of the first Bubsy game, with team members coming up with three possible scenarios for the game, none of them involving the first game's antagonists "The Woolies". A pilot for an animated TV show adaptation titled What Could Possibly Go Wrong? aired on Thanksgiving Day. Some characters from the TV pilot appeared in the second game. The sequel moved into full production after the first game was released and was a commercial success. However, a different, new development team within Accolade was responsible for making the game, without original designer Michael Berlyn's assistance. Like the original, the Sega Genesis and Super NES versions are virtually identical, but the Game Boy version is drastically different, with different level designs and only black-and-white graphics, unless played on a Super Game Boy, which applied very basic coloring.

Promotion
A lottery was put up where the grand prize winner would have a 3-day trip to Hollywood as well as a tour of the studio where the Bubsy TV special was created. First prize winners were awarded shirts, while second prizer winners were awarded patches.

Reception

Much like the first game, Bubsy II received mostly positive reviews. Mean Machines Sega Magazine gave the Genesis version a rating of 84 and a very positive review stating "The sequel has cleared up all the problems in the playability stakes - Bubsy is given a chance to show us his tricks." Electronic Games gave the SNES version an A−. Italian magazine Consolemania gave the Genesis version 83. Spanish magazine Super Juegos gave both the Genesis and SNES versions 88. TodoSega, another Spanish magazine, gave 90 for the Genesis version. French magazine Supersonic gave the Genesis version 91%.

GamePro gave the SNES version a positive review. While they commented that the new features are initially confusing and that some of the level designs are not as charming or original as those of the first game, they concluded, "Bubsy's personality is still the top draw in Bubsy II, a new kind of adventure that's a definite change of pace for the irascible feline." They were generally complimentary to the Genesis version as well, voicing approval for the multiple paths through each stage, the special items, the new minigames, and the improved controls over the first game. However, they commented that the game is boringly easy for experienced players. GamePro thoroughly panned the Game Boy version, saying that none of the character's charming personality is retained in this version, which also suffers from sloppy controls, dull enemies, slow-paced gameplay, and graphics which are poor even by Game Boy standards.

Electronic Gaming Monthly, in sharp contrast, commented of the Game Boy version that "Even if you never played [Bubsy] before, this is a good introduction." and scored it a 6 out of 10.

In retrospect, IGN conceded that the gameplay had generally been cleaned up, but still felt the game lacked originality, stating "...the game just never quite gelled. Coming in only a year after the original Bubsy meant corner-cutting, which manifested itself in the art direction and enemy design. Too many assets are reused and some of the stages, such as the music levels, are just uninspired." Hardcore Gaming 101 echoed these sentiments, saying the game "Bubsy 2 is definitely an improvement,...but the designers simply cranked the dial up from 'pile of junk' to 'terribly mediocre'."

Original Bubsy creator Michael Berlyn, who was not involved in this game of the series, has strongly criticized the game, stating that it "just about killed the franchise" and that "Accolade’s choices about doing Bubsy II in-house with the development team selected was a mistake that pretty much buried him...Bubsy II failed due to mismanagement of the character. It was done by people who, no matter how talented and interested they may have been, had not understood the original vision".

Notes

References

External links

1994 video games
Accolade (company) games
Bubsy
Game Boy games
Platform games
Sega Genesis games
Side-scrolling video games
Super Nintendo Entertainment System games
Video games about time travel
Video games developed in the United States
Video games set in amusement parks
Multiplayer and single-player video games
Video game sequels